was established in 1971 in Okayama, Japan as a maintenance company for racing vehicles and engines. Since its inception, company activities have grown to include manufacturing and development of racing engines for various forms of Japanese motorsports, ranging from Formula 3 to GT300. The experience gained in the realm of professional motorsports is applied to all TODA Racing products available to consumers.

Corporate history 

Toda Racing was established in 1971 in Okayama Japan as a maintenance company of racing cars. It started activities in the SUZUKA FL Race and participation in SUZUKA FJ1300 Race. In 1978 it clinched the championship in SUZUKA FJ1300 Race (Driver: Kengo Nakamoto) and moved from FJ1300 to Formula 3. In 1979 it started maintenance of NOVA TOYOTA 2TG engine and started development of TODA TOYOTA 2TG engine, followed in 1980 by starting development of the TODA F3 Chassis.

In 1981 it began participating in the British F3 championship and finished second in the series. In 1982 it started development of the F2 BMW engine. In 1985 it started development of TODA TOYOTA 3SG Engine with Bosch fuel injection type and began Participation in all Japan F3 championship series. It started development of TODA TOYOTA 3SG with TODA fuel injection type in 1986. In 1987 it became champion in the All Japan F3 championship series and discontinued maintenance of TOYOTA 3SG. In 1988 it started maintenance of MUGEN MF-204 and started development of TODA MUGEN MF-204. It also founded the F3 racing team SUPERHAKKA Racing team (F3 driver: Kouji Satou).

In 1989 it founded F3000 racing team CHERENA Racing team (F3000 driver: Osamu Nakako), started maintenance of the MUGEN MF-308 engine and participated in all Japan F3000 championship series and all Japan F3 championship series.

In 1990 it participated in the all Japan F3 championship series as SUPERHAKKA Racing team. It also introduced the TAKISAWA CNC piston lathe machine and introduced the TOYODA machining center.

In 1991 it introduced a three-dimensional coordinate measuring machine, IBM CATIA CAD CAM system and MAZAK CNC multitask machine. It participates in all Japan F3 championship series (F3 driver: Kazuaki Takamura). The TODA Racing team was the first Japanese driver that acquired third place in a FUJI International F3 race and SUPERHAKKA Racing team won the PANASONIC F3 super cup four years in a row. In 1992 it established the FIGHTEX division and expanded product manufacturing division and started development of TODA HONDA F4 engine. 1994 saw production of TODA HONDA F4 engine and sales. TOYADA machining center was introduced in 1996.

1997 saw the foundation of the LIAN TODA Racing team, continued development of TODA MUGEN MF-204 and began development of NISSAN SR20DET GT300 engine. 1997 also saw the second victory in the All Japan F3 championship series and won the championship in F4 Suzuka series and F4 TI series with TODA HONDA F4 engine. TODA Racing team was founded in 1998, and finished second in All Japan championships (driver: Hiroki Kato) and sixth place in MACAU Grand Prix. Team driver was changed from Hiroku Kato to Wagner Ebrahim in 1999 and to Seija Ara in 2000. The TOYODA CNC camshaft grinding machine was introduced in 1999.

External links
 

Companies based in Okayama Prefecture
Motor vehicle engine manufacturers
Automotive companies established in 1971
1971 establishments in Japan
Japanese Formula 3 Championship teams
Engine manufacturers of Japan